Wegmans Food Markets, Inc. is a privately held American supermarket chain. It is headquartered in Gates, New York, and was founded in 1916 in Rochester.

The company has stores in New York, Pennsylvania, New Jersey, Maryland, Massachusetts, Virginia, North Carolina, Delaware and Washington, D.C. along with a planned expansion into Connecticut.

Wegmans has appeared on Fortunes annual "100 Best Companies to Work For" list since the list first appeared in 1998. In 2020, the company was ranked at number three on that list, based on an employee survey of satisfaction.

History
Wegmans is a privately owned company, founded in 1916 by brothers John and Walter Wegman as the Rochester Fruit and Vegetable Company. Wegmans is headquartered in the Rochester suburb of Gates. Danny Wegman is the chairman. His daughter, Colleen Wegman, is president and CEO; his other daughter, Nicole Wegman, is senior vice-president. Danny's father, Robert Wegman, who died in 2006, was previously chairman. Robert was the son of co-founder Walter Wegman. During his life, Robert Wegman was a pioneer in the retail food business, as well as a generous donor to educational institutions and other charities. On January 30, 2016, Wegmans celebrated its 100th anniversary.

Expansion

In 1965, the chain expanded beyond the Rochester area, with a store in Hornell in the Southern Tier of New York State, then 1968 in Syracuse, and again in 1977 with its first Buffalo store. The first store outside New York opened in 1993 in Pennsylvania and the expansion continued into New Jersey in 1999, Virginia in 2004, Maryland in 2005, Massachusetts in 2011, North Carolina in 2019,  and Washington, D.C. and Delaware in 2022. As a part of the company's continued expansion efforts, Wegmans opened its fifth Maryland location in Columbia on June 17, 2012. Its sixth Maryland location opened in Crofton on October 28, 2012, followed by a Germantown location on September 15, 2013. Wegmans opened a store at the Montgomery Mall in North Wales, Pennsylvania, on November 3, 2013, the first store to be part of a shopping mall since the closing of the Midtown Plaza store in Rochester.

Wegmans, having long planned to expand into New England, opened their first store in that region in Northborough, Massachusetts, on October 16, 2011. 2014 saw Wegmans opening two more Massachusetts stores, in Newton, Chestnut Hill on April 27, and in Burlington on October 26. Its fourth Massachusetts store opened in Westwood on October 11, 2015. The eighth Maryland store opened in Owings Mills, Maryland in September 2016. In late 2016, Wegmans opened Virginia stores in Short Pump (August), Midlothian, and Charlottesville (November). The Hanover Township, New Jersey location opened in July 2017. The Montvale, New Jersey location opened in September 2017. The Medford, Massachusetts, location opened on November 5, 2017. The Natick, Massachusetts, location opened on April 29, 2018. The Chantilly, Virginia, location opened on June 3, 2018. The Lancaster, Pennsylvania, location opened on September 23, 2018. The Virginia Beach, Virginia location opened on April 28, 2019. The chain's first store in North Carolina, located in Raleigh, opened on September 29, 2019. It was also the chain's 100th store. The chain's first location in New York City, at Admiral's Row in Brooklyn's Navy Yard, opened on October 27, 2019. 

The West Cary, North Carolina location opened on July 29, 2020. The Harrison, New York location, in Westchester County, opened on August 5, 2020. The Tysons, Virginia location opened on November 4, 2020. The Chapel Hill, North Carolina location opened on February 24, 2021. The Wake Forest, North Carolina location opened on May 19, 2021. The Carlyle, Virginia location opened on May 11, 2022. The City Ridge, Washington, D.C. location opened on July 13, 2022. The Wilmington, Delaware location, the chain's first location in that state, opened on October 26, 2022. The Reston, Virginia location opened on February 1, 2023. Six other locations are currently in the works, including Holly Springs, North Carolina; Norwalk, Connecticut, the chain's first location in that state; Rockville, Maryland; Yardley, Pennsylvania; Manhattan on Astor Place and Lake Grove, New York, the chain's first store on Long Island. Wegmans scrapped plans to build new stores in Annapolis, Maryland, Middletown, New Jersey, Arcola, Virginia, and Cary, North Carolina.

In July 2021, Wegmans announced it will launch the company's first Manhattan store in 2023. The store will be at 770 Broadway, the site of the recently shuttered Astor Place Kmart. In April 2022, Wegmans announced it would open their first Long Island location, located in Lake Grove. No opening date has been announced at this time.

Chase-Pitkin Home and Garden Centers 
Wegmans was the parent company of Chase-Pitkin, a regional home improvement retailer. On October 4, 2005, Wegmans announced that it would close all Chase-Pitkin stores by early 2006 and focus on its supermarket operations. The decision to exit the home improvement business was reportedly due to the increasing dominance of national chains such as Lowe's and The Home Depot. Chase-Pitkin stores closed individually at various points throughout March 2006.

Discontinuation of tobacco products 
In January 2008, Wegmans announced that it would no longer sell tobacco products because of their negative effects on human health and the environment and would offer smoking cessation programs to all employees. The decision drew praise from the American Lung Association of New York State, which presented Wegmans with the "Lung Champion Award".

Operations

Wegmans is ranked 29th on the Supermarket News list of the Top 75 North American Food Retailers based on sales volume. In 2009 Stores Magazine showed it to be the 74th-largest retailer in the United States with estimated revenues of $4.67 billion. As of 2006, it was the 66th largest privately held company, as determined by Forbes. On Forbes's 2005 list, Wegmans ranked 54th.

Most of Wegmans' newer stores are of the superstore or megamarket type, with a large area, a variety of foods aimed at an upscale clientele, and, in many stores, Market Café in-store dining areas. From 2002 to 2009, Wegmans owned and operated Tastings, a full-service restaurant at its Pittsford, New York store. Tastings was replaced with The Food Bar, a "seafood shack"-styled restaurant in the same space; and later with The Burger Bar, serving hamburgers. Along with the Burger Bar, Wegmans offers many other food options. This includes a Sub Shop, Sushi Bar, Pizza Shop, and a Salad Bar – all of which offer quick, prepackaged items for one's convenience. Next Door by Wegmans, a stand-alone restaurant operated by Wegmans, opened across the street from the Pittsford store in 2009.

In January 2007, Wegmans announced two business ventures: (1) opening a  liquor store in Pittsford (adding to its two existing wine centers, in Virginia and New Jersey); and (2) the creation of a $28 million Culinary Innovation Center in Chili, New York, a corporate research and development facility, including a new central kitchen, replacing some of the operations at its meat center. The liquor store opened in April 2008 as Century Pittsford Wines. This business model has been replicated at three other New York Wegmans locations, in Buffalo, DeWitt and Johnson City. Ownership of each liquor store is held by a different member of the Wegman family due to New York State regulations prohibiting individuals or corporations from owning multiple liquor stores.

After Wegmans updated their logo to a script font, in November 2010, Walgreens filed a trademark infringement lawsuit against Wegmans, claiming the "W" in the Wegman's logo was too similar to Walgreens. The lawsuit was settled in April 2011, with Wegmans agreeing to discontinue use of its "W" logo by June 2012, although the supermarket retains the right to use the "Wegmans" name in script. According to Jo Natale, Wegmans director of media relations, "The cost of making relatively minor changes to a limited number of products was much less than the cost of litigating this case to the end."

Wegmans offers a pick-up service called "Personal Shopping" at select locations. In June 2017, Wegmans partnered with Instacart to provide home delivery service. In February 2020, Wegmans announced its Brooklyn store would offer grocery delivery to Manhattan residents as an expansion on their Instacart partnership. Delivery fees start at $3.99, and Manhattan customers are given a two to five hour delivery window.

In April 2020, in response to the COVID-19 outbreak, Wegmans began limiting the number of people in their stores, provided their employees with masks, and installed plexiglass shields at all checkout areas.

Wegmans brand
Wegmans began branding some products in 1979, offering basic commodities at a lower price than national brands. The Wegmans brand has gradually expanded. In 1992, it began another line of products, "Food You Feel Good About", which contain no artificial colors, flavors, or preservatives. The next sub-brand to be launched was Italian Classics in 1995, which introduced pastas, canned tomatoes, and olive oils imported from Italy. In 2002, Wegmans launched a line of organic products, which are labeled with a green leaf.

Accolades and fan base
Wegmans has received much media attention for customer fan base, organic food, hot food bar, the depth of its food selection and employee happiness. Food Network recognized it with its award for Best Grocery Store in 2007. Consumer Reports subscribers voted Wegmans the top grocery store in 2017; it has held the top spot since 2006. It was also profiled as part of the "Here Are The Jobs" segment on MSNBC's PoliticsNation on July 6, 2012. In 2016, Market Force surveyed over 10,000 grocery store shoppers nationwide, and Wegmans was rated "America's favorite grocery store".

Wegmans has a loyal fan base of customers who have received recognition for their devotion, who have lined up overnight in the thousands for a new store opening, regularly write "love letters" to the store to ask for one to open in a region not presently served, and in Northborough, Massachusetts, many high school students staged a musical about the store. The store's fans have their own Twitter hashtag "#Wegmania" and a Tumblr.

In popular culture
The Wegmans brand was used extensively in the American sitcom The Office. The program is set in the city of Scranton, Pennsylvania, which has a Wegmans store, although the series was filmed in suburban Los Angeles.

References

Further reading
 Wegmans footprint in Pennsylvania ~

External links
 
 
 

Companies based in Rochester, New York
Privately held companies based in New York (state)
American companies established in 1916
Retail companies established in 1916
Supermarkets of the United States
1916 establishments in New York (state)
Family-owned companies of the United States